AVAC is a New York City-based international non-profit community- and consumer-based organization working to accelerate ethical development and delivery of AIDS vaccines and other HIV prevention options to populations throughout the world. Founded in 1995, AVAC uses public education, policy analysis, advocacy and Community Mobilization to accelerate a comprehensive response to the epidemic.

Communication Strategies:

AVAC's goal is to involve affected populations in work to promote the ethical introduction and distribution of life-saving HIV/AIDS technologies such as vaccines and microbicides.

AVAC works to provide independent analysis, policy advocacy, public education and mobilisation to enhance AIDS vaccine research and development. A key channel for these efforts is the AVAC website, which is designed to support a network of individuals by sharing research, policy alerts, and strategies for action. Various links and resources designed to inform and engage vaccine advocates are offered.

Partners
Funders include The Bill and Melinda Gates Foundation, the Ford Foundation, the International AIDS Vaccine Initiative, Until There's a Cure Foundation, Broadway Cares/Equity Fights AIDS, the Gill Foundation, and the Overbrook Foundation.

References 

Vaccination in the United States
Non-profit organizations based in New York City
HIV vaccine research
Organizations established in 1995
HIV/AIDS organizations in the United States
Vaccination-related organizations